The women's 200 metre breaststroke event at the 2015 African Games took place on 7 September 2015 at Kintele Aquatic Complex.

Schedule
All times are Congo Standard Time (UTC+01:00)

Records
Prior to the competition, the existing world and championship records were as follows.

Results

Heats

Final

References

External links
Official website

Swimming at the 2015 African Games
2015 in women's swimming